Moise Nicoară National College is a public day high school in Arad, Romania.

History
Opened in 1873, the school building was erected over the previous four years, during the Austro-Hungarian period. In October 1919, following the union of Transylvania with Romania, the school acquired its present name, after the 19th century cultural figure and patriot , and became the first Romanian-language boys' high school in Arad. The building became the property of the Romanian state in 1934, and was declared a historic monument in 1955. In 1948, following the advent of the Communist regime and subsequent education reform, the institution became known as Arad Middle School nr. 1, the name Ioan Slavici being added in 1957. It became a high school once again in 1965 and readopted the Nicoară name in 1991. It was accorded the "national college" distinction in 2000. The building underwent a thorough restoration that culminated with its reopening in 2013, at which point it was one of the country's most modern high school structures.

Alumni
, historian
Vasile Goldiș, politician
Caius Iacob, mathematician
Alexandru Ioan Lupaș, mathematician
Atanasie Marian Marienescu, ethnographer
Teodor Meleșcanu, politician
Mihail Neamțu, politician
, lawyer
, physicist and politician
Tiberiu Popoviciu, mathematician
Ioan Slavici, writer
, lawyer and politician

Notes

External links

 Official site

Educational institutions established in 1873
Schools in Arad County
Historic monuments in Arad County
Buildings and structures in Arad, Romania
National Colleges in Romania
1873 establishments in Romania